The 1998 Women's World Championship was a women's snooker tournament organised by the World Ladies Billiards and Snooker Association. The event is recognised as the 1998 edition of the World Women's Snooker Championship first held in 1976. Kelly Fisher defeated Karen Corr 5–0 in the final to win the title.

The rounds leading up to the final were played at Radion Plaza, Sheffield, with the final played at the Crucible Theatre on a Sunday morning during the 1998 World Snooker Championship. Eight qualifying groups produced sixteen qualifiers who each faced one of the top sixteen seeds in the last 32 round. Defending champion Corr had won nine of the preceding events on the women's snooker circuit and had not lost to Fisher for 14 months before this tournament. However, Fisher took the title by whitewashing Corr in a rematch of the previous year's final. The highest break of the competition was 95, compiled by Kim Shaw in the last 32 round.

Prize Fund 

Winner: £5,000
Runner-up £2,500
Semi-final: £1,000
Quarter-final: £500
Last 16: £175

Main Draw

References 

1998 in English sport
1998 in snooker
1986 in women's sport
International sports competitions hosted by England
World Women's Snooker Championship